The following is a list of dams in Okayama Prefecture, Japan.

List

See also

References 

Okayama